Love & Air Sex, formerly known as The Bounceback, is an American romantic comedy film directed by Bryan Poyser and written by Poyser, David DeGrow Shotwell, and Steven Walters. The film stars Sara Paxton, Ashley Bell, Zach Cregger, and Michael Stahl-David. The film premiered at the 2013 SXSW Film Festival and was picked up by Tribeca Film for a U.S. day-and-date release. The film won awards for "Best Writing" at the 2013 Gen Art Film Festival and "Best Ensemble Cast" at the 2013 Napa Valley Film Festival.

Synopsis
Stan (Michael Stahl-David), a depressed struggling filmmaker, flies to Austin for the weekend to "accidentally" meet up with his ex-girlfriend Cathy (Ashley Bell), a med student.  He finds their friends, crude, foul-mouthed Jeff (Zach Cregger) and hard-partying Kara (Sara Paxton) in the process of breaking up. To complicate matters, the Air Sex World Championships are in town, Cathy is mooning over a guy named Tim, Tim's obnoxious younger brother Ralph is courting Kara, Stan is attracted to an LA native, Haley, Jeff also finds a new love interest, and Stan's roommates Joe and Redge are underfoot.

Cast

 Michael Stahl-David as Stan
 Ashley Bell as Cathy
 Sara Paxton as Kara
 Zach Cregger as Jeff
 Justin Arnold as Tim
 Marshall Allman as Ralph
 Addison Timlin as Haley
 Zach Green as Joe
 Ashley Spillers as Ellie
 Brian McGuire as Redge
 Jesse Tilton as Sandee/Poke-Hot-Ass, Jeff's new girlfriend

Release
The film premiered at the 2013 SXSW Film Festival as "The Bounceback" in the Narrative Spotlight Section on March 10, 2014. In January 2014, the film was acquired by independent distributor Tribeca Film and was retitled "Love and Air Sex." The film was released day-and-date, on VOD February 4 and theatrically on February 7, 2014. The theatrical release was accompanied by a ten-city road-show featuring live air sex demonstrations and competitions led by comedian Chris Trew. International rights were picked up by Archstone Distribution.

Reception
The film was met with mixed reviews from film critics, with some praise from  New York Times film critic  Stephen  for its "cheeky attitude" and "zany vitality,", and from its local paper, the Austin Chronicle. There was lackluster response from  both Slant magazine, and Roger Ebert. FilmThreat critic Don Simpson remarked, "Poyser's oh-so-frank approach to sexuality goes much further than any Hollywood movie I have ever seen." The film was panned by the New York Daily News.

References

External links
 

2013 films
2010s English-language films